Doon Assembly constituency is one of the 68 assembly constituencies of Himachal Pradesh a northern Indian state. Doon is also part of Shimla Lok Sabha constituency.

Members of Legislative Assembly

Election candidate

2022

Election results

2017

See also
 List of constituencies of the Himachal Pradesh Legislative Assembly
 Solan district
 Shimla Lok Sabha constituency

References

External links
 

Solan district
Assembly constituencies of Himachal Pradesh